James Henry Osborne (born September 7, 1949) is an American former professional football player who was a defensive tackle for the Chicago Bears in the National Football League (NFL).  He attended Southern University, and spent his entire 13-year pro career with Bears. Osborne retired in 1984, one year shy of the Bears Super Bowl win. At the time of his retirement he lived in Olympia Fields. He won the Brian Piccolo Award from the Bears organization in 1972.

References

1949 births
Living people
People from Sylvania, Georgia
Players of American football from Georgia (U.S. state)
American football defensive tackles
Southern Jaguars football players
Chicago Bears players
Sportspeople from Cook County, Illinois
People from Olympia Fields, Illinois
Brian Piccolo Award winners